Santiago is a city in Paraguay, located in the Misiones Department in the south.

Toponymy
Originally named San Ignacio de Caaguazú, it was re-founded in the Misiones department, Paraguay, in 1669 with the name of Santiago Apostol.

History
Santiago is an old Jesuit mission city and today still preserves many characteristics of colonial times, like its large main square, the "house of the Indians" and a museum that preserves objects of art from colonial times.

During colonial times, Santiago was a very important city because of its population of about 3,000 inhabitants.

During the holidays, it organized the Opera of Santiago.

Geography
Santiago is located 278 kilometers from Asunción, the capital Paraguay. It is located on a hill between the cities of Ayolas and San Patricio.

Climate
In summer, the temperature reaches 39°C, and in winter can drop to 0°C. The annual average is 21°C.

Population
Santiago has a population of 7,702 inhabitants, 4,017 men and 3,685 women, according to the General Direction of Polls, Statistics and Census.

Economy
The people of Santiago mostly raise cattle. Other local agriculture includes corn, sugar cane, cotton and soy.

Municipality
The former governor is Ignacio Larre (Liberal Party).

Tourism
Santiago has a sacred art museum, the "Museo Jesuítico de Santiago" (Jesuit Museum of Santiago). The museum displays paintings and sculptures, including a collection of 3 sculptures depicting the Passion and Death of Jesus Christ and La Piedad. 

The church preserves many images carved in wood by the natives. The "House of the Indians" museum exhibits images of saints. The church has a unique altarpiece in the Missions, many of the pictures in the church center around biblical themes. 

The Benedictine monastery "Tupasy María" is a place of meditation, it was founded in 1984.

In January the "Fiesta de la Tradicion Misionera" (Missioner Traditional Festivity) brings horse breakers from Paraguay, Argentina, Brazil and Uruguay to show their abilities in racing and breaking in horses. Traditional Paraguayan food is sold at the festival, including "Batiburrillo", sopa and Chipa guasu with barbecues and the traditional Mandioca. The festival is usually held on January 20, 21 and 22. Michel Telo performed at the festival in the 2014. It is organized by the "Club de Leones" of Santiago Misiones, and claims to be the biggest rural traditional festivity in Paraguay.

The State "Tacuaty" is place for the Festival of Breaking-in and Folklore, located on the road to Ayolas.

References

Geografía Ilustrada del Paraguay, Distribuidora Arami SRL; 2007. 
Geografía del Paraguay, Primera Edición 1999, Editorial Hispana Paraguay SR

External links
 Secretaria Nacional de Turismo
 ABC Digital "Así es Nuestro País" MISIONES (VIII Departamento)
 Turismo en Misiones

Populated places in the Misiones Department